Count of Paris was a title for the local magnate of the district around Paris in Carolingian times. After Hugh Capet was elected King of France in 987, the title merged into the crown and fell into disuse. However, it was later revived by the Orléanist pretenders to the French throne in an attempt to evoke the legacy of Capet and his dynasty.

Merovingian counts

Guideschi

 Bodilon
 till 678: Saint Warinus (620–678)

Pippinids
 748–753: Grifo (726–753), son of Charles Martel and his second wife, Swanahild

Carolingian counts

Girardids
 759/760–779: Gerard I (died 779) 
 779–811/815: Stephen (754–811/815), son of previous
 811/815–816: Beggo (or Begon) (755/760–816), brother of previous
 816: Leuthard I of Paris (740–816), brother of Beggo and also count of Fézensac
 838–841: Gerard II (810–877/879), son of previous and brother of Adalard the Seneschal, also duke of Viennois
 841–858: Leuthard II of Paris (806–858), son of Beggo

Welfs
 858–859: Conrad I the Elder (800–862/4), also Count of Argengau and of Linz

Girardids
 877–?: Adalard (830–890), Count palatine, father of Adelaide who was the wife of King Louis II of France

Robertians
 882/3–888: Odo (857–898), later king of West Francia
 888–922: Robert (866–923), also Count of Blois, Anjou, Tours, and Orléans, Margrave of Neustria, and later king of West Francia
 923–956: Hugh the Great (898–956), also Duke of the Franks
 956–987: Hugh Capet (939–996), later King of the Franks

Bouchardids
 987–1005: Bouchard I the Venerable (died 1005), also Count of Vendôme, Corbeil, and Melun
 1005–1017: Renaud of Vendôme (991–1017), also Bishop of Paris as well as Count of Vendôme

Orléanist counts

July Monarchy
In 1838, during the July Monarchy, King Louis-Philippe I granted the title to his newly born grandson, Philippe. After Louis-Philippe abdicated during the French Revolution of 1848, Orléanist monarchists considered Philippe and his descendants to be the legitimate heirs to the throne. In 1870, at the beginning of the French Third Republic, Philippe and the Orléanists agreed to support the legitimist pretender, Henri, Count of Chambord, but resumed Philippe's claims after Henri's death in 1883.

 1838–1848: Philippe, Count of Paris (1838–1894)

Counts of Paris without legal creation
In 1929, Orléanist pretender Jean d'Orléans, Duke of Guise (1874-1940) granted the title "Count of Paris" to his eldest and only son Henri d'Orléans (1908–1999), a courtesy title Henri retained until his death and under which he was best known. After him, the title has been adopted by his successors in capacity as the Orléanist pretender to the French throne.

 1929–1999: Henri, Count of Paris (1908–1999)
 1999–2019: Henri, Count of Paris (1933–2019)
 2019–present: Jean, Count of Paris (born 1965)

The next in line is Jean's eldest son, Prince Gaston Louis Antoine Marie d’Orléans (born 2009).

See also
 List of French monarchs
 Siege of Paris (885-886)
 House of Capet
 Orléanists

References

 
Paris